The Airwave Scenic is an Austrian two-place, paraglider that was designed by Bruce Goldsmith and produced by Airwave Gliders of Fulpmes. It is now out of production.

Design and development
The Scenic was designed as a tandem glider for flight training and as such was referred to as the Scenic Bi, indicating "bi-place" or two seater.

The glider is DHV 1-2 certified.

Specifications (Scenic Bi)

References

Scenic
Paragliders